Cultivation may refer to:
 The state of having or expressing a good education (bildung), refinement, culture, or high culture
 Gardening
 The controlled growing of organisms by humans
 Agriculture, the land-based cultivation and breeding is of plants (known as crops), fungi and domesticated animals
 Crop farming, the mass-scale cultivation of (usually a specific single species of) plants as staple food or industrial crop
 Horticulture, the cultivation of non-staple plants such as vegetables, fruits, flowers, trees and grass
 Fungiculture, the cultivation of mushrooms and other fungi for producing food, medicine and other commercially valued products
 Animal husbandry, the breeding of domesticated mammals (livestocks and working animals) and birds (poultries), and occasionally amphibians (e.g. bullfrogs) and reptiles (e.g. snakes, softshell turtles and crocodilians)
 Insect farming, the breeding of economic insects such as honeybees, silkworms and cochineals
 Aquaculture, the controlled breeding or "farming" of aquatic animals, plants and algae
 Pisciculture, the breeding of fish
 Algaculture, the breeding of algae, particularly seaweeds
 Tillage, the cultivation of fertile soil (etymological meaning of cultivation)
 Land development
 Colonization, socio-political cultivation of land
 Colonialism, the idea of socio-political cultivation of land and people
 Civilizing mission, cultivation of people in the sense of cultural assimilation or forced assimilation
 Developmentalism
 Microbiological culture, a method of multiplying microbial organisms
 Cultivation theory, George Gerbner's model of media effects
 A common translation for several terms originating in Chinese and broader East Asian philosophy and literature, such as Qigong and Kung Fu practices (including martial arts), Self-cultivation, and certain supernatural tropes often featured in Xianxia fiction.  
As a proper noun
 Cultivation, a video game by Jason Rohrer
 Cultivation, a 2006 album by Gram Rabbit
 Cultivate (store)

See also 
 Cult (disambiguation)
 Farming (disambiguation)